The India national cricket team toured England from 22 June to 9 September 2002. The tour comprised a four-match Test series, preceded by a triangular One Day International tournament that also featured Sri Lanka. India won the ODI tournament, beating England in the final, while the Test series was drawn 1–1.

Tour matches

50-over: Sussex v India

50-over: Kent v Indians

50-over: Leicestershire v Indians

First-class: Indians v West Indies A

First-class: Hampshire v Indians

First-class: Worcestershire v Indians

First-class: Essex v Indians

First-class: Derbyshire v Indians

NatWest Series (ODI)

2nd Match: England v India

3rd Match: India v Sri Lanka

5th Match: England v India

6th Match: India v Sri Lanka

8th Match: England v India

9th Match: India v Sri Lanka

Final: England v India

Test series

1st Test

2nd Test
{{Test match
| date = 8–12 August 2002
| team1 = 
| team2 = 

| score-team1-inns1 = 357 (101.1 overs)
| runs-team1-inns1 = Virender Sehwag 106 (183)
| wickets-team1-inns1 = Matthew Hoggard 4/105 (35.1 overs)

| score-team2-inns1 = 617 (144.5 overs)
| runs-team2-inns1 = Michael Vaughan 197 (258)
| wickets-team2-inns1 = Zaheer Khan 3/110 (26 overs)

| score-team1-inns2 = 424/8d (115 overs)
| runs-team1-inns2 = Rahul Dravid 115 (244)
| wickets-team1-inns2 = Dominic Cork 2/54 (12 overs)

| score-team2-inns2 = 
| runs-team2-inns2 = 
| wickets-team2-inns2 =

| result = Match drawn
| report = Scorecard
| venue = Trent Bridge, Nottingham
| umpires = Rudi Koertzen (SA) and Russell Tiffin (Zim)
| motm = Michael Vaughan (Eng)
| toss = India won the toss and elected to bat.
| rain = 
| notes = Steve Harmison, Robert Key (both Eng) and Parthiv Patel (Ind) made their Test debuts.
 At 17 years & 153 days, Parthiv Patel became Test cricket's youngest wicket-keeper.
}}

3rd Test

4th Test

References

 Playfair Cricket Annual Wisden Cricketers Almanack'' (annual)

External links
CricketArchive

2002 in English cricket
International cricket competitions in 2002
2002
2002 in Indian cricket